1981 saw three new characters making their debuts on Coronation Street: Nick Tilsley, Eunice Gee and Alma Halliwell.

Nick Tilsley

Nicholas Paul "Nick" Tilsley (also Platt) was born off screen during an episode broadcast on 31 December 1980, but made his first appearance on 5 January 1981. He was played by Warren Jackson from 1981 until 6 September 1996. Adam Rickett took over the role on 15 October 1997 until 21 April 1999 but returned for three separate stints between 2002 and 2004 and made his final appearance as Nick on 11 July 2004. Ben Price took over the role on 21 December 2009. Nick is the first-born child of Brian (Christopher Quinten) and Gail Tilsley (Helen Worth). He is the older brother of Sarah Platt (Tina O'Brien) and David Platt (Jack P. Shepherd) as well as the uncle of Bethany (Lucy Fallon), and Lily Platt and the grandson of Audrey Roberts. Nick's storylines have included his adolescent problems and his role in the fraught relationship between his parents, his teenage marriage to Leanne Battersby (Jane Danson) and their divorce, and his engagement to Maria Connor (Samia Smith). Since his return in 2009 his storylines have featured him remarrying and once again divorcing Leanne, his one-night stand with David's wife Kylie Platt (Paula Lane), suffering brain damage after being involved in car accident which was caused by David, and his business partnership with and later one-day marriage to Carla Connor (Alison King).

Eunice Gee

Eunice Gee (née Clarke, previously Nuttall) born 1937  had been a barmaid and was a dry-cleaner when she met Fred Gee at a singles evening. This fitted in with his plans, as he had the chance of the licence of The Crown and Kettle - but the brewery would only consider married couples. They married after a whirlwind romance, but The Crown and Kettle had already been taken and then the next pub fell through when the brewery found out Eunice had previously been sacked from the Foundryman's Arms after £30 disappeared, although she always blamed this on another barmaid.

Annie Walker threw them out of the Rovers Return Inn when they were refused the pub, as the overbearing Eunice acted as though she owned the place and upset both Annie and Betty Turpin. For a while, they ran the Community Centre and moved in there with Eunice's daughter, Debbie, but the marriage started to fall apart. Councillor Ben Critchley, Chairman of the Social Services committee found that the Gees had got the Community Centre through Alf Roberts, without his authority and proceeded to evict them. Conveniently, Ben Critchley was able to offer positions at his Park View Hotel in Weatherfield, and even more conveniently, as he had an eye for Eunice, he knew she would accept but Fred refuse. Fred reluctantly accepted that their marriage would not work; he moved back into the Rovers and the marriage ended. In November 1983 she said she wanted to remarry and divorced Fred.

In 1999 she turned up again, running the Park Road B&B where Jack and Vera Duckworth stayed after leaving the Rovers. In May 1999 her brother-in-law died suddenly in Spain, and Eunice went out there to help her sister Dolly run her bar, leaving the Duckworths running the B&B.

Alma Halliwell

1981
, Coronation Street
Coronation Street